Sava-Arangel Čestić (born 19 February 2001) is a Serbian professional footballer who plays as a defender for Eerste Divisie club Heracles Almelo and the Serbia national team.

Club career
A native of Offenbach am Main, Čestić began his youth career with local outfits SG Rosenhöhe and Kickers Offenbach. In 2015, he joined the youth academy of FSV Frankfurt, from where he transferred to Bundesliga team Schalke 04. In July 2019, he joined the academy of 1.FC Köln. On 28 November 2020, he made his professional debut for Köln in an away game at Borussia Dortmund. The day after his debut, it was reported that Čestić had extended his contract with the club until July 2024. On 7 January 2022, his contract with Köln was terminated with immediate effect.

On 10 January 2022, it was announced that Čestić had signed with the Croatian club Rijeka, but his contract was terminated after six months. On 22 December 2022, he signed a contracted with the Dutch club Heracles Almelo.

International career
He made his debut for the Serbia national team on 7 June 2021 in a friendly against Jamaica.

Career statistics

International

References

External links

2001 births
Living people
Footballers from Hesse
Sportspeople from Offenbach am Main
Serbian footballers
Association football defenders
Serbia international footballers
Serbia youth international footballers
Serbia under-21 international footballers
German footballers
German people of Serbian descent
1. FC Köln players
1. FC Köln II players
HNK Rijeka players
Heracles Almelo players
Bundesliga players
Regionalliga players
Croatian Football League players
German expatriate footballers
German expatriate sportspeople in Croatia
Serbian expatriate footballers
Serbian expatriate sportspeople in Croatia
Expatriate footballers in Croatia
Serbian expatriate sportspeople in the Netherlands
Expatriate footballers in the Netherlands